The 2014 Wimbledon Championships are described below in detail, in the form of day-by-day summaries.

Day-by-day summaries

Day 1 (23 June)
 Seeds out:
Men's Singles:  Fernando Verdasco [18],  Andreas Seppi [25],  Vasek Pospisil [31]
Women's Singles:  Samantha Stosur [17],  Sloane Stephens [18],  Garbiñe Muguruza [27]
 Schedule

Day 2 (24 June)
 Seeds out:
Men's Singles:  Guillermo García-López [28],  Ivo Karlović [29],  Dmitry Tursunov [32]
Women's Singles:  Jelena Janković [7],  Sara Errani [14],  Roberta Vinci [21],  Anastasia Pavlyuchenkova [26],  Svetlana Kuznetsova [28],  Sorana Cîrstea [29]
 Schedule

Day 3 (25 June)
 Seeds out:
 Men's Singles:  David Ferrer [7],  Ernests Gulbis [12],  Mikhail Youzhny [17]
 Women's Singles:  Victoria Azarenka [8],  Flavia Pennetta [12],  Elena Vesnina [32]
 Women's Doubles:  Květa Peschke /  Katarina Srebotnik [3]
 Schedule

Day 4 (26 June)
 Seeds out:
 Men's Singles:  Richard Gasquet [13],  Philipp Kohlschreiber [22],  Gaël Monfils [24]
 Women's Singles:  Carla Suárez Navarro [15],  Klára Koukalová [31]
 Men's Doubles:  Treat Huey /  Dominic Inglot [10]
 Schedule

Day 5 (27 June)
 Seeds out:
 Men's Singles:  Tomáš Berdych [6],  Fabio Fognini [16],  Alexandr Dolgopolov [21],  Roberto Bautista Agut [27],  Marcel Granollers [30]
 Women's Singles:  Li Na [2],  Dominika Cibulková [10],  Venus Williams [30]
 Women's Doubles:  Lucie Hradecká /  Michaëlla Krajicek [13],  Liezel Huber /  Lisa Raymond [15]
 Schedule

Day 6 (28 June)
 Seeds out:
 Men's Singles:  Jerzy Janowicz [15]
 Women's Singles:  Serena Williams [1],  Andrea Petkovic [20],  Kirsten Flipkens [24]
 Women's Doubles:  Cara Black /  Sania Mirza [4]
 Schedule

Middle Sunday (29 June)

Following tradition, Middle Sunday was a day of rest, with no matches played.

Day 7 (30 June)
 Seeds out:
 Men's Singles:  John Isner [9],  Jo-Wilfried Tsonga [14],  Kevin Anderson [20]
 Women's Singles:  Agnieszka Radwańska [4],  Ana Ivanovic [11],  Caroline Wozniacki [16],  Alizé Cornet [25]
 Men's Doubles:  Łukasz Kubot /  Robert Lindstedt [7]
 Mixed Doubles:  Leander Paes /  Cara Black [4]
 Schedule

Day 8 (1 July)
 Seeds out:
 Men's Singles:  Rafael Nadal [2],  Kei Nishikori [10],  Feliciano López [19],  Tommy Robredo [23]
 Women's Singles:  Maria Sharapova [5],  Ekaterina Makarova [22]
 Men's Doubles:  Marcel Granollers /  Marc López [6],  Rohan Bopanna /  Aisam-ul-Haq Qureshi [8],  Eric Butorac /  Raven Klaasen [13],  Jamie Murray /  John Peers [14],  Juan Sebastián Cabal /  Marcin Matkowski [15],  Pablo Cuevas /  David Marrero [16]
 Women's Doubles:  Ekaterina Makarova /  Elena Vesnina [5],  Serena Williams /  Venus Williams [8],  Anabel Medina Garrigues /  Yaroslava Shvedova [12],  Garbiñe Muguruza /  Carla Suárez Navarro [16]
 Mixed Doubles:  Mike Bryan /  Katarina Srebotnik [1],  Alexander Peya /  Abigail Spears [3],  David Marrero /  Arantxa Parra Santonja [9],  Juan Sebastián Cabal /  Raquel Kops-Jones [11]
 Schedule

Day 9 (2 July)
 Seeds out:
 Men's Singles:  Andy Murray [3],  Stan Wawrinka [5],  Marin Čilić [26]
 Women's Singles:  Angelique Kerber [9],  Sabine Lisicki [19]
 Men's Doubles:  Julien Benneteau /  Édouard Roger-Vasselin [4],  Julian Knowle /  Marcelo Melo [9],  Jean-Julien Rojer /  Horia Tecău [11]
 Women's Doubles:  Hsieh Su-wei /  Peng Shuai [1],  Raquel Kops-Jones /  Abigail Spears [7],  Julia Görges /  Anna-Lena Grönefeld [10]
 Mixed Doubles:  Bob Bryan /  Květa Peschke [2],  Rohan Bopanna /  Andrea Hlaváčková [7],  Jean-Julien Rojer /  Anna-Lena Grönefeld [8],  John Peers /  Ashleigh Barty [12]
 Schedule

Day 10 (3 July)
 Seeds out:
 Women's Singles:  Simona Halep [3],  Lucie Šafářová [23]
 Men's Doubles:  Alexander Peya /  Bruno Soares [2],  Daniel Nestor /  Nenad Zimonjić [3]
 Women's Doubles:  Ashleigh Barty /  Casey Dellacqua [6],  Alla Kudryavtseva /  Anastasia Rodionova [11]
 Mixed Doubles:  Horia Tecău /  Sania Mirza [6],  Bruno Soares /  Martina Hingis [13]
 Schedule

Day 11 (4 July)
 Seeds out:
 Men's Singles:  Milos Raonic [8],  Grigor Dimitrov [11]
 Men's Doubles:  Leander Paes /  Radek Štěpánek [5],  Michaël Llodra /  Nicolas Mahut [12]
 Women's Doubles:  Andrea Hlaváčková /  Zheng Jie [9]
 Mixed Doubles:  Jamie Murray /  Casey Dellacqua [10]
 Schedule

Day 12 (5 July)
 Seeds out:
 Women's Singles:  Eugenie Bouchard [13]
 Men's Doubles:  Bob Bryan /  Mike Bryan [1]
 Women's Doubles:  Tímea Babos /  Kristina Mladenovic [14]
 Mixed Doubles:  Daniel Nestor /  Kristina Mladenovic [5],  Aisam-ul-Haq Qureshi /  Vera Dushevina [16]
 Schedule

Day 13 (6 July)
 Seeds out:
 Men's Singles:  Roger Federer [4]
 Mixed Doubles:  Max Mirnyi /  Chan Hao-ching [14]
 Schedule

References

Day-by-day summaries
Wimbledon Championships by year – Day-by-day summaries